Ioka is an unincorporated community in eastern Duchesne County, Utah, United States.

Description
The name means "bravado".

The main (and the only paved) road in the community is Utah State Route 87 (SR‑87/Ioka Lane/West 3000 South), which runs east‑west through the community.

History
The community was first settled in 1907 and named Mural (meaning a "walled in valley"), but the name was changed to Ioka by about 1915. In 1908 a post office for the community was established, and remained in operation until 1944.

See also

References

External links

Unincorporated communities in Duchesne County, Utah
Unincorporated communities in Utah